The Low Frequency in Stereo are a post-rock group that was founded in February 2000 in Haugesund, Norway.

The band is known both in Norway and internationally and have played renowned festivals like Quart, Dour and South By Southwest 

Senior Editor of Rolling Stone David Fricke described their concert in Austin, Texas in 2005 as "a mixture of the long solo elements in The Doors set to the riptide of Joy Division's "Transmission" with the surf guitar twang of Dick Dale."

Current line-up
Per Steinar Lie - bass, vocals
Ørjan Haaland - drums, vocals
Hanne Andersen - guitar, organ, vocals
Njål Clementsen - guitar, vocals
Linn Frøkedal - guitar, organ, vocals

Former members 
Per Plambech Hansen - guitar (2000–2005)

Discography

Albums
 The Low Frequency in Stereo (2002)
 Travelling Ants who Got Eaten by Moskus (2004)
 The Last Temptation Of...The Low Frequency in Stereo Vol. 1 (2006)
 Futuro (2009)
 Pop Obskura (2013)

Live
 Live at MoldeJazz feat. Kjetil Møster (LP, 2014)

EPs
 Die Electro Voice/Low Frequency 7" (2001)
 Moonlanding EP 10" (2001)
 Astro Kopp EP (2005)

Singles
 Monkey Surprise (2006)

External links
https://web.archive.org/web/20061108131218/http://www.lowfrequencyinstereo.com/
https://web.archive.org/web/20050404200349/http://www.lowfrequency.dk/
http://www.myspace.com/lowfrequencyinstereo
http://www.rec90.com/

Norwegian post-rock groups
Rune Grammofon artists
Musical groups established in 2000
2000 establishments in Norway
Musical groups from Haugesund